Fishdick  is a cover album by Polish thrash metal band Acid Drinkers. It was released on June 1994 through Loud Out Records. The album was recorded from 22 January to 20 March 1994 at Modern Sound Studio in Gdynia. The cover art was created by Tomek Daniłowicz.

The reissue of the album features a different cover featuring the members of the band wearing makeup worn by American rock band Kiss.

Track listing

Bonus Tracks

Personnel 
 Tomasz "Titus" Pukacki – vocal, bass
 Robert "Litza" Friedrich – backing vocals, guitar
 Dariusz "Popcorn" Popowicz – guitar, vocals on track 2
 Maciej "Ślimak" Starosta – drums, vocals on track 10
Engineered – Adam Toczko, Tomek Bonarowski
Mixed – Piotr Madziar, Litza
Grzegorz Skawiński – guitar solo in "Deuce"
Kuba Mańkowski – guitar solo in "Highway Star"
Kisiel – guitar solo in "Highway Star"
Patrycja – vocal in "Balada"

Release history

References 

1994 albums
Acid Drinkers albums
Covers albums